Jeena Isi Ka Naam Hai is a 2017 Indian Drama film directed by Keshhav Panneriy. Starring Arbaaz Khan, Ashutosh Rana, Himansh Kohli, Supriya Pathak, Manjari Fadnis, Rati Agnihotri and Prem Chopra in the lead roles. It is produced by Purnima Mead under the banner Bibia Films Private Ltd. It was released on 3 March 2017. This film is based on the novel "A Little Heaven in Me" authored by Purnima Mead.

Plot

The film opens with writer Alia Patrick (Manjari Fadnis) receiving an award at the White House. However, Alia receives a bad news from India and she hurries back to the county. Lakshmi (Supriya Pathak) had died.

The film flashes back to Alia's childhood. Her father, a factory worker, struggles to send his two sons and Alia to a good school, and his limited finances which compels him to move Alia to a government school. Undeterred, Alia focuses on her studies and writing and writes for the school paper. She meets Alex (Himansh Kohli), her first love, in college. She continues writing and her work catches her principal's eye and she is sent to interview Kunwar Vikram Pratap Singh(Ashutosh Rana) the ruler of a former royal kingdom.

The prince is arrogant and misogynous at first but Alia quietly and firmly puts him in his place. The prince comes around and fancies Alia but she despises him entirely. He sends expensive gifts to Alia's weak-willed father and asks her hand for marriage. She refuses the proposal. Her father forces her to marry as this marriage will be a great (financial) help to her ailing and debt-ridden family. Alia tearfully consents and bids Alex goodbye.

She enters the royal palace where she quickly learnt that her royal duties are limited to producing male children and presiding over the palace chores. (She cannot leave the palace.) In time she discovers that her husband, the prince, a drunk and a playboy is brutal to the servants and abusive towards her. Alia's only solace is her handmaiden Lakshmi. Lakshmi also manages the household and attends to grievances from the local townsfolk. One day the prince discovers Alia's journal which chronicles her unhappy marriage and has it burnt. Alia faints from the shock. She is pregnant. The prince quietly instructs the head servant and the hospital staff to ‘do the needful’ (meaning kill the girl child). Alia is devastated. Lakshmi helps her flee from the palace and packs her off on a bus to Mumbai. It is a touching moment when Lakshmi gives her own jewels to Alia.

Alia arrives in Mumbai and follows a tea-vendor boy to his orphanage. The orphanage manager is too happy to have her stay with them so she can teach the orphan children. She starts a new life here. She eventually applies for a writer job at a small magazine run by the eccentric, eclectic, Urdu lover Shaukat Mirza (Prem Chopra). This Mirza believes in serious journalism and is sceptical if the young and wide-eyed Alia is up for the job. But Alia walks through the slums and bylanes and draws upon her own struggles to produce a Bombay report which so impresses Mirza that he hires her on the spot. Alia gives birth to a baby girl.

Alia meets the wealthy NRI Aditya Kapoor (Arbaaz Khan) at one of his charity events and confronts him about the reporters at the event: is it about charity or about raising his public profile? She eventually discovers that he rings true; it is about charity, the reporters were incidental, and the charity is his way of reaching out to his parents who both died a long time ago. Aditya asks her out but she turns him away.

Mirza recommends Alia's work overseas and she receives a job offer from a New York newspaper. She turns it down as she does not want to leave Mirza who has come to be a father figure to her. But when KunwarVikram Singh finds her in Mumbai Alia realizes she cannot be safe in India anymore. She signs over her share of the royal properties in exchange for a divorce. And she is forced to leave Mirza and her orphanage behind and go to New York.

Her life starts anew. She becomes engrossed in her work as a reporter. She meets Aditya Kapoor again at a party where she muses about him. She volunteers for an assignment to cover the war in the Middle East. This is a grand success and she is rewarded with a promotion. But her joy is short-lived when she discovers that her envious and spiteful female co-workers accuse her of sleeping with Aditya Kapoor (who, unbeknownst to her, is a trustee of the newspaper) to get the promotion. Horrified, she confronts him. He admits he had brought her to New York but the promotion was her own effort. She says she wants to give it all up and return to India. At this juncture, Aditya admits that he loves her. He also forcefully says that running away is not fair to all the people – her school principal, Mirza, the New York paper, Lakshmi, and Aditya himself – who genuinely thought she was a good writer and helped her go forward. She realises Aditya’s worth and decides to marry him.

The film ends as Alia cremates her beloved Lakshmi.

Cast

Arbaaz Khan as Aditya Kapoor, is a suave and successful NRI businessman based in USA. He is known to be a philanthropist and a person of footpath.
Ashutosh Rana as Kunwar Vikram Pratap Singh, depicts the grandeur of a royal lineage and his lifestyle and attitude makes for an interesting perspective to the lives of royal families of Rajasthan.
Himansh Kohli as Alex, is the quintessential lover who lights up the screen with his boy-next-door look. His optimism, grin and passionate love are his special charms.
Manjari Fadnis as Alia Patrick / Aliya Vikram Pratap Singh, is a simple girl from a town in Rajasthan. With stars in eyes, she has the determination to achieve her dreams without compromising on her principle, making her character an inspiration for today’s young women.
Supriya Pathak as Laxmi, is an iron-willed lady who believes and practices woman empowerment. She is respected by one and all and is the voice of sanity in her village.
Rati Agnihotri as Rajmata Pratibha Devi, is a strong woman, who heads the royal family. Her elegance and charisma make her the queen of hearts.
Prem Chopra as Shaukat Ali Mirza ‘Karachiwale’, is the most interesting character of the film with a passion for books, Urdu poetry and philosophy. He is a veteran man of Urdu Literature, with a zest for wife and positive vibes.

Soundtrack

The music for the film is composed by Harry Anand, Onkar Minhas, Deepak Agrawal, Visshoo Mukherjee and Siddhant Madhav while background score is composed by Salil Amurte. The lyrics are penned by Deepak Agrawal, Asish Pandit, Kunwar Juneja, Mahesh Sharma and Fate Shergill.

External links

References 

2010s Hindi-language films